The Smithsonian Institution, or simply The Smithsonian, is a group of museums and research centers in the U.S. 

Smithsonian may also refer to:

 Smithsonian (magazine), the official journal of the Smithsonian Institution
 Smithsonian Channel, an American pay television channel 
 Smithsonian station, a station of the Washington Metro 
 The Smithsonian Institution, a 1998 novel by Gore Vidal
 3773 Smithsonian, an asteroid

See also 

 James Smithson
 Smithsonian Institution Building, in Washington, D.C. 
 Smithsonian Agreement, 1971, created a new dollar standard